Chad Wayne Lewis (born October 5, 1971) is an American former professional football player who was a  tight end in the National Football League (NFL) for the Philadelphia Eagles and St. Louis Rams.

Early life
Lewis grew up in Orem, Utah and played football and ran track at Orem High School.  On March 30, 1986, Chad earned the rank of Eagle Scout, the highest award in the Boy Scouts of America. Lewis, who is a member of the Church of Jesus Christ of Latter-day Saints, served a two-year church mission in Taichung, Taiwan before attending college.  While in Taiwan, he learned to speak Mandarin.

College career
After walking on at Brigham Young University (BYU), Lewis finished his collegiate career with 111 receptions for 1,376 yards, and ten touchdowns.  As a junior, he was an All-WAC first-team choice, and a UPI All-American honorable mention.

Professional career
Lewis signed as an undrafted free agent with the Philadelphia Eagles in 1997.  After playing 1 year and two games with the Eagles he was signed by the St. Louis Rams for one season.  Lewis was released 10 weeks into the season before the Rams won a Super Bowl title in the 1999 Super Bowl XXXIV over the Tennessee Titans.  Lewis was re-signed by the Eagles and caught the game-clinching touchdown pass in the 2005 NFC Championship game.  However, during this reception, Lewis suffered a Lisfranc injury to his left foot that kept him out of the Super Bowl XXXIX loss to the New England Patriots.

In 2002, the NFL sent Lewis to Taiwan, Singapore and Thailand to promote the league.  Since then he has visited China several times to give interviews and help with football clinics.  He has also spoken at the Fourth of July celebration in China.

In 2009, Lewis released a memoir, Surround Yourself With Greatness, and in 2010, he returned to BYU as an Associate Athletic Director.

Lewis is a regular speaker at BYU and the Church of Jesus Christ of Latter-day Saints's Missionary Training Center.

NFL statistics

References

1971 births
Living people
People from Fort Dix
Sportspeople from Orem, Utah
American football tight ends
Latter Day Saints from Utah
BYU Cougars football players
Philadelphia Eagles players
St. Louis Rams players
National Conference Pro Bowl players
American Mormon missionaries in Taiwan
20th-century Mormon missionaries
Ed Block Courage Award recipients